George Putnam III is the editor and founder of The Turnaround Letter, a newsletter published by New Generation Research, Inc. which deals with investment opportunities related to distressed securities, bankruptcies and turnarounds. He is also president of New Generation Advisers, Inc., which manages a hedge fund which invests in distressed securities.

He graduated from St. Mark's School in Southborough, Massachusetts, where he is an active trustee making a speech at graduation every year.

Putnam is a graduate of Harvard College, Harvard Law School and Harvard Business School.

He is also a trustee for Putnam Investments, a mutual fund group founded by his grandfather George Putnam, and an Overseer of the Sea Education Association.

References

External links
New Generation Research, Inc.: George Putnam III

Putnam, George
Living people
St. Mark's School (Massachusetts) alumni
Harvard Business School alumni
Harvard Law School alumni
Year of birth missing (living people)
Harvard College alumni